Darzi Kola noshirvani (also Romanized as Darzī Kolā noshirvani, Darzī Kolā noshirvani

, and Darzī Kolā noshirvani) is a village in Karipey Rural District, Lalehabad District, Babol County, Mazandaran Province, Iran. At the 2006 census, its population was 242, in 59 families.

References 

Populated places in Babol County